Planorbella duryi, common name the Seminole rams-horn, is a species of air-breathing freshwater snail, a pulmonate gastropod mollusk in the family Planorbidae, the ram's horn snails. The species is endemic to Florida and is found frequently in home aquariums.

Description

In the wild they are brown. In captivity they have been bred to come in many colours. These colours are:

 Brown
 Brown leopard
 Blue
 Blue leopard
 Red/orange
 Pink
 Green
 Purple

Distribution

This species of snail is endemic to the freshwater ecosystems of the US state of Florida. Fossils of the species have been found dating back to the Piacenzian, in the Tamiami formation. 

It has been introduced to Hawaii and lives in the wild there. It is an introduced species in various European islands and countries including:

 Great Britain as a "hothouse alien"
 Ireland as a "hothouse alien"
 Poland 
 Hungary
 Parts of Southern Nigeria [e.g Ogun State, Lagos, Oyo]

Habitat

They are found in most freshwater habitats including streams and ponds.

Conservation status

This species is listed by natureserve as G5.

Diet

They eat dead or decaying plants or fish, and algae.

Breeding

They are hermaphrodites. They lay eggs and are very fast breeders.

Human use

They are a very common aquarium snail. Eggs can get into aquariums on plants. Some people consider them pests due to their ability to breed very fast and overpopulate. Other people value them as part of their clean up crew.

References

External links 

 images
 AnimalBase info at: 

Planorbella
Gastropods described in 1879